Francisco Esteban Arrué Pardo (born 7 August 1977) is a Chilean football manager and former footballer who played as a midfielder.

Club career
Arrué is one of the six Chilean players who have played in his country's three giant clubs: Colo-Colo, Universidad de Chile and Universidad Católica.

International career
Representing his nation, he won a bronze medal in the 2000 Summer Olympics at Sydney.

Managerial career
He has coached Colchagua two times in the Chilean Segunda División: 2019 and from 2020. He joined San Marcos de Arica for the 2023 season in the Primera B.

Honours

Club
Santiago Morning
 Copa Chile: Runner-up 2000

Universidad Católica
 Primera División de Chile: 2005 Apertura

Universidad de Concepción
 Copa Chile: 2008–09

International
 Sydney Olympic Games (1): Bronze medal 2000

References

External links
 
 
 
 2003-04 Statistics at LFP.es 
 2002-03 Statistics at Eurosoccer.ch 

1977 births
Living people
Footballers from São Paulo
Sportspeople from São Paulo
Chilean footballers
Citizens of Chile through descent
Naturalized citizens of Chile
Chilean expatriate footballers
Olympic footballers of Chile
Colo-Colo footballers
Santiago Morning footballers
Club Deportivo Universidad Católica footballers
FC Luzern players
CD Leganés players
Club Puebla players
Universidad de Chile footballers
Atlético Nacional footballers
Universidad de Concepción footballers
Deportes La Serena footballers
C.D. Huachipato footballers
Coquimbo Unido footballers
Chilean Primera División players
Segunda División players
Liga MX players
Categoría Primera A players
Primera B de Chile players
Expatriate footballers in Switzerland
Chilean expatriate sportspeople in Switzerland
Expatriate footballers in Spain
Chilean expatriate sportspeople in Spain
Expatriate footballers in Mexico
Chilean expatriate sportspeople in Mexico
Expatriate footballers in Colombia
Chilean expatriate sportspeople in Colombia
Olympic medalists in football
Association football midfielders
Olympic bronze medalists for Chile
Medalists at the 2000 Summer Olympics
Chilean football managers
San Marcos de Arica managers
Segunda División Profesional de Chile managers
Primera B de Chile managers